Samuel Baugher Sneath (December 19, 1828 – January 7, 1915) was an American businessman involved in banking, railroading, and manufacturing.”  He was considered among the "founders, builders, and defenders" of the United States.  Sneath and his wife Laura were also philanthropists, and the Samuel B. Sneath Memorial Publication Fund was established by Mrs. Sneath with a gift to the Divinity School of Yale University on October 19, 1922.

Sneath was born, raised, and educated in Tiffin, Ohio.  He was 13 years old when his father died, and soon began working at the family fanning mill.  His early business ventures included a dry goods store and a grain firm.  Later he became involved with businesses as diverse as the Sneath Glass Company, National Exchange Bank of Tiffin, and the Tiffin, Fostoria, and Eastern Electric Railway.

Sneath's brother Richard G. Sneath and cousin A. G. Sneath were also involved in banking, as was Sneath's son Ralph Davis Sneath.  Most of the Sneath siblings moved to California, but Samuel and son Ralph remained in Ohio for much of their lives. The Sneath family became some of the most prominent bankers in the United States by the beginning of the 20th century, and continued to be notable until the 1960s.

Identity and origins
Samuel Sneath’s grandfather, George Sneath, was a Scotsman who emigrated to the North American Province of Pennsylvania prior to the American Revolutionary War.  The family settled in Delaware County, Pennsylvania, and the Sneath family home was in a cross roads village that became known as “Sneath’s Corner”.   (Sneath's Corner is now part of Brookhaven, Pennsylvania).  Years later, George’s son Richard moved to Maryland, and married Catherine Baugher.  In 1826, the couple moved from Frederick County, Maryland, to Tiffin, Ohio.  Their family included three small children at that time, and son Richard George Sneath eventually became involved in banking.  Richard and Catherine had more children after moving to Tiffin, including Samuel Baugher Sneath.

Richard Sneath (Samuel's father) was a successful businessman who owned a tavern.  He also built a fanning mill, which was used to clean and sort coarse grains—and would provide valuable experience for his son Samuel.  The mill was successful enough to enable Sneath to invest profits in a hotel.  Samuel Sneath was only 13 years old when his father died.  By the age of 15, Sneath was employed at the family's fanning mill.

Businesses
Shriver & Sneath – dry goods began 1853
grain
National Exchange Bank of Tiffin – began 1865
Tiffin Woolen Mills – formed in 1867 by a group of investors that included S.B. Sneath and A.G. Sneath.
Commercial Bank of Tiffin – began 1876
Interstate Trust and Banking Co.
Mortgage Securities Co. of New Orleans
Western Pottery Co.
National Machinery Co.
Sneath Glass Company
Tiffin Fostoria & Eastern Electric Railway
Tiffin City Railway
Tiffin, Fostoria, and Eastern Railroad
Riverview Park
Webster Manufacturing plant

Organizations and philanthropy
Oakley Park – land donated by Warren P. Noble, Samuel B. Sneath, and J. W. Shaufelberger in 1888.

Notes and references

References

Cited works

1828 births
People from Tiffin, Ohio
1915 deaths